Kaptanganj is a town and a Nagar Panchayat in Kushinagar district of Uttar Pradesh, a state in the Republic of India.

Demographics

As of the 2011 census, Kaptanganj has a population of 23,526.  Males constitute 53% of the population and females 47%.  Kaptanganj has an average literacy rate of 59%, lower than the national average of 74%. In Kaptanganj, roughly 13% of the population is under the age of 6.

It was announced as a town area in 1911 by the British Raj. Major places are Arya Nagar (Mangal Bazar), Chandani Chowk, Subhash Chowk, Azad Chowk and Shiva Chowk.

Transportation 

The town is connected to many important cities with National Highway 28B and State Highway No. 64. The proposed Buddha Expressway between Kushinagar and Sarnath will provide connectivity with south eastern cities of the state like Varanasi, Allahabad, Azamgarh as well as Kolkata through National Highway 2 in Varanasi.

Kaptanganj Railway Station is on a broad gauge railway that connects to major cities of the country. Currently, trains running between Gorakhpur and Thawe originate here. It is expected to be a part of the proposed Kushinagar International Airport.

References

Cities and towns in Kushinagar district